Nine Track Mind is the debut studio album by American singer Charlie Puth. It was released on January 29, 2016, by Artist Partner Group and Atlantic Records, after being scheduled to be released on November 6, 2015.

The album's lead single, "Marvin Gaye", which features Meghan Trainor, was originally released as Some Type of Loves only single on February 10, 2015, and peaked at number 21 on the Billboard Hot 100 , while topping the charts in various countries including France, Ireland, New Zealand, and the United Kingdom. The album's second single, "One Call Away", was released on August 20, 2015, reaching number 12 on the Billboard Hot 100. On May 24, 2016, Puth released the third single "We Don't Talk Anymore", featuring Selena Gomez, with it having peaked at number 9 on the Billboard Hot 100. A music video for "Dangerously" was released on November 2, 2016.

Upon release, Nine Track Mind was a commercial success, debuting and peaking at number 6 on the Billboard 200 with 65,000 units. The album received negative reviews from critics, who criticized the simplistic production, overt focus on love ballads, and Puth's vocal performance. Puth himself has confessed that he was disappointed at how the album turned out.

Background
Puth first became known in 2011 for his YouTube cover of Adele's "Someone Like You", which resulted in two guest appearances on The Ellen DeGeneres Show, and him signing to eleveneleven, a record label founded by Ellen DeGeneres. In 2014 and 2015, Puth was working with Wiz Khalifa on "See You Again", written for the film Furious 7 which opened in April 2015. Puth also invited Meghan Trainor to sing on his song "Marvin Gaye", released in February 2015. "Marvin Gaye" would return as the lead single of Nine Track Mind.

Release
The finalized track listing was revealed on December 11, 2015. The final track listing removed the tracks "Know Your Name" and "Hard" and replaced them with "Dangerously" and "We Don't Talk Anymore". "I Won't Tell a Soul" was also due for inclusion on the Japanese edition, but was subsequently removed. Puth embarked on his Nine Track Mind Tour in March 2016. A deluxe edition, containing three new songs, was released on November 11, 2016.

Singles and videos
"Marvin Gaye", which features American singer-songwriter Meghan Trainor, was released on February 10, 2015, as the first single from the album. "One Call Away" was announced by Puth as the second single from the album on August 4, 2015, and was released along with the pre-order of the album on August 20, 2015. On May 11, 2016, Puth announced "We Don't Talk Anymore" as the third single from the album. Selena Gomez provides vocals for the song. It impacted US contemporary hit radio on May 24, 2016. "Dangerously" was sent to Italian radios as the fourth and final single from the album on December 2, 2016. A music video for the song was released on November 2, 2016.

A music video was released on February 19, 2016, to the remix version of "Suffer", directed by Austin Starrett Winchell.

Critical reception

Nine Track Mind received negative reviews from music critics, who were critical of the album's writing, production, and Puth's overall performance. On Metacritic, which assigns a rating out of 100 based on reviews from mainstream critics, the album gained an average score of 37, based on 7 reviews, indicating "generally unfavorable reviews," making it the 15th-lowest critic-reviewed album on the site. The Guardians Rachel Aroesti gave Nine Track Mind three out of five stars, saying, "the standard of his songwriting is consistently high, and his central theme — romantic obsession that verges on the masochistic — makes for a record that softly burns." In a negative review for Pitchfork, Jia Tolentino — recognizing Puth's talent and "considerable abilities" — criticized the album for sounding juvenile, and wrote that "the album's emotional range covers the spectrum from light longing to light infatuation, contributing to the overall sense that Nine Track Mind is aimed exclusively at hairlessness: children, prepubescents, the discomfitingly waxed."

Track listing

Notes:
  signifies a co-producer.
  signifies an additional producer.
 "Losing My Mind" contains elements of Vera Hall's song "Wild Ox Moan".

PersonnelMusicians Charlie Puth – lead vocals, programming (all tracks); background vocals (9)
 Luke Potashnick – drums, guitar (1)
 Joseph Kupiers – cello (2)
 Juan Chaves – conductor (2)
 Nick Seeley – strings (2)
 Emily Williams – viola (2)
 Mark Landson – viola, violin (2)
 Elizabeth Elsner – violin (2)
 Miika Gregg – violin (2)
 Veronica Gan – violin (2)
 Kaveh Rastegar – bass guitar (3)
 Asaf Rodeh – guitar (5)
 Jesse Shatkin – bass guitar, drum programming, synthesizer (7)
 Franck Van der Heijden – conductor, orchestra arrangement (7)
 Giorgio Tuinfort – orchestra arrangement (7)
 Riciotti Ensemble – orchestra (7)
 Johan Carlsson – acoustic guitar, background vocals, guitar, piano, programming, synthesizer, tambourine (9)
 Ross Golan – background vocals (9)
 David Bukovinszky – cello (9)
 Mattias Bylund – strings (9)
 Mattias Johansson – violin (9)
 George Tizzard – additional vocals, drums, keyboards (11)
 Rick Parkhouse – additional vocals, programming (11)
 Jack Martello – background vocals (11)Technical'
 Dave Kutch – mastering
 Manny Marroquin – mixing
 Charlie Puth – recording (1, 2, 4–6, 8, 10, 12), additional engineering (7)
 DJ Frank E – recording (1)
 Matt Prime – recording (1)
 Ryan Gladieux – recording (3), additional engineering (8)
 Paul Pauwer – recording (7)
 Alex HeMe Toval – recording (11)
 Rick Parkhouse – recording (11)
 Samuel Kalanjjian – engineering (2)
 Cory Bice – engineering (9)
 Sam Holland – engineering (9)
 Marcus van Wattum – editing (7)
 Chris Galland – mixing assistance
 Ike Schultz – mixing assistance
 Jaime Wosk – additional engineering (7)
 Mattias Bylund – additional engineering (9)

Charts

Weekly charts

Year-end charts

Certifications

Release history

Notes

References

2016 debut albums
Charlie Puth albums
Albums produced by J. R. Rotem
Atlantic Records albums
Albums produced by Johan Carlsson